ISDE may stand for:

Institute for Space and Defense Electronics, a research facility at Vanderbilt University
International Six Days Enduro, an international off-road motorcycle competition
International Society of Doctors for the Environment, an environmental organization